The Dreyse needle-gun was a ground-breaking 19th-century military breechloading rifle. The gun, which was the first breech-loading rifle to use a bolt action to open and close the chamber, was the main infantry weapon of the Prussians in the Wars of German Unification. It was invented in 1836 by the German gunsmith Johann Nikolaus von Dreyse (1787–1867) who had been conducting numerous design experiments since 1824.

The name "ignition needle rifle" was taken from its firing pin because it passed like a needle through the paper cartridge to strike a percussion cap at the base of the bullet. However, to disguise its innovative design, the rifle entered military service in 1841 as the "leichtes Perkussionsgewehr Modell 1841". It had a rate of fire of about six rounds per minute.

History 
The first types of needle-gun made by Johann Nikolaus von Dreyse were muzzle-loading, with the novelty of the weapon lying in the long needle driven by a coiled conchoidal spring which fired the internal percussion cap on the base of the sabot. It was his adoption of the bolt-action breechloading principle combined with this igniter system which gave the rifle its military potential, allowing, as it did, a much faster rate of fire.

After successful testing in 1840, the Prussian king Friedrich Wilhelm IV ordered 60,000 of the new rifles. Dreyse set up the Dreyse-Zündnadel factory in Sömmerda with the help of state loans to ramp up production. It was accepted for service in 1841 as the leichtes Perkussionsgewehr Model 1841, but only 45,000 had been produced by 1848. It was used in combat for the first time during the German revolutions of 1848–49 and proved its combat superiority in street fighting during the May Uprising in Dresden in 1849. Many German states subsequently adopted the weapon. The Sömmerda factory could not meet demand and produced only 30,000 rifles a year. Most of the Prussian infantry in the 1850s were still equipped with the obsolete 1839 Model caplock Potsdam musket, whose ballistic performance was clearly inferior to the French Minié rifle and the Austrian Lorenz rifle. The Prussian Army's low level of funding resulted in just 90 battalions being equipped with the weapon in 1855. Dreyse consented to state manufacture of the rifle to increase production. The Royal Prussian Rifle Factory at the Spandau Arsenal began production in 1853, followed by Danzig, Saarn and Erfurt. At first, the Spandau factory produced 12,000 Dreyse needle guns a year, rising to 48,000 in 1867.

The British Army evaluated the Dreyse needle gun in 1849–51. The trials suggested that the Dreyse was "too complicated and delicate" for service use. The French carabine à tige muzzle-loading rifle was judged to be a better weapon, and an improved version was adopted as the Pattern 1851 Minié-type muzzle-loading rifle.

After the Prussian army received a 25% increase in funding and was reformed by Wilhelm I, Albrecht von Roon and Helmuth von Moltke the Elder from 1859 to 1863, the Dreyse needle gun played an important role in the Austro-Prussian victory in the Second Schleswig War against Denmark in 1864. The introduction of cast steel barrels made industrial mass production of the weapon a reality in the early 1860s. The new 1862 model and the enhanced M/55 ammunition type expedited the use and widespread adoption of the weapon in the 1860s. The success of German private industry in delivering the necessary amount of armaments for the army marked the definite end of government-owned army workshops. The Prussian Army infantry had 270,000 Dreyse needle guns by the outbreak of the decisive Austro-Prussian War in 1866. The employment of the needle-gun changed military tactics in the 19th century, as a Prussian soldier could fire five (or more) shots, even while lying on the ground, in the time that it took his Austrian muzzle-loading counterpart to reload while standing. Production was ramped up after the war against Austria and when the Franco-Prussian War broke out in 1870, the Prussian Army had 1,150,000 needle guns in its inventory. The success of the design spurred subsequent developments in firearms technology and, before the start of the Franco-Prussian War of 1870–71, the French introduced the Chassepot rifle. The Prussians and their allies won the war, but the Chassepot proved superior to the needle-gun in every way.

In 1867, Romania purchased 20,000 rifles and 11,000 carbines from the Prussian government. These were used to great effect in the Romanian War of Independence.

Sometime in the late 1860s, Japan acquired an unknown number of Model 1862 rifles and bayonets. These were marked with the imperial chrysanthemum stamp. China also acquired Dreyse rifles for the modernisation of their armed forces.

Ammunition and mechanism 

The cartridge used with this rifle consisted of the paper case, the bullet, the percussion cap and the black powder charge. The 15.4 mm (0.61 in) bullet was shaped like an acorn, with the broader end forming a point, and the primer attached to its base. The bullet was held in a paper case known as a sabot, which separated from the bullet as it exited the muzzle. Between this inner lining and the outer case was the powder charge, consisting of 4.8 g (74 grains) of black powder.

The upper end of the paper case is rolled up and tied. Upon release of the trigger, the point of the needle pierces the rear of the cartridge, passes through the powder and hits the primer fixed to the base of the sabot. Thus the burn-front in the black powder charge passes from the front to the rear. This front-to-rear burn pattern minimizes the effect seen in rear-igniting cartridges where a portion of the powder at the front of the charge is forced down and out of the barrel to burn wastefully in the air as muzzle flash. It also ensures that the whole charge burns under the highest possible pressure, theoretically minimising unburnt residues. Consequently, a smaller charge can be used to obtain the same velocity as a rear-ignited charge of the same bullet calibre and weight. It also increases the handling security of the cartridge, since it is virtually impossible to set the primer off accidentally.

There was also a blank cartridge developed for the needle-gun. It was shorter and lighter than the live round, since it lacked the projectile, but was otherwise similar in construction and powder load.

Limitations 
British trials in 1849–51 showed that:
 The spring that drove the needle was delicate.
 When the needle was dirty, the rifle tended to misfire. Colonel Hawker considered that a new needle was required every 12 shots.
 When the gun was heated and foul, operating the bolt required much strength.
 The barrel tended to wear at the junction with the cylinder.
 The escape of gas at the breech got worse as firing continued.

Its effective range was not as great as that of the Chassepot, against which it was fielded during the Franco-Prussian War. The main reason for this was that a sizable amount of gas escaped at the breech when the rifle was fired with a paper cartridge. An improved model, giving greater muzzle velocity and increased speed in loading, was introduced later, but it was replaced shortly thereafter by the Mauser Model 1871 rifle.

The placement of the primer directly behind the bullet meant the firing needle was enclosed in black powder when the gun was fired, causing stress to the pin, which could break over time and render the rifle useless until it could be replaced. Soldiers were provided with two replacement needles for that purpose. The needle could be replaced quite easily, even in the field, in under 30 seconds. Because the rifle used black powder, residue accumulated at the back of the barrel, making cleaning necessary after about 60–80 shots. This was not a large problem because the individual soldier carried fewer cartridges than that and Dreyse created an "air chamber" by having a protruding needle tube (the Chassepot also had this, but it was more likely to jam after fewer shots because of its smaller-diameter chamber). A soldier trained well before the war of 1866 had to finish field cleaning in less than 10 minutes.

Comparison with contemporary rifles

Appearances in popular media 
The Prussian Needle gun appears in Ensemble Studio's Age of Empires III in the hands of "Needle Gunners", who act as German skirmisher units.

Prominent Austrians frequently betray a subtle and often humorous obsession with the Prussian needle gun in Robert Musil's The Man Without Qualities.

The Danish TV show 1864 features the Dreyse needle gun.

Gallery

See also 
 M1819 Hall rifle (An earlier breechloader)
 Needle gun

References 

 Translated article on the Needle Gun, retrieved 30 September 2005.
This article incorporates text from the 1911 Encyclopædia Britannica.

Bibliography

Further reading
 
 Rolf Wirtgen (Ed.) Das Zündnadelgewehr - Eine militärtechnische Revolution im 19.Jhd., Herford 1991 (In-depth German monograph on Dreyse and the development of his weapon in historical context)

External links 

 The Needle-Gun and Cartridge, Chambers's Journal, 18 August 1866
 Cut through drawings of the Needle Gun
 Forgotten Weapons – Dreyse M60 Needle Rifle

Early rifles
Prussian Army
Rifles of Germany
Single-shot bolt-action rifles